
Six French ships of the French Navy have borne the name Fantasque ("capricious"):

 , a fireship, lead ship of her class
 , a  64-gun ship of the line
  (1761), a 
 , an auxiliary patrol boat (ex-Diaz, a Danish whaler)
 , a 
  (1936), a destroyer, lead ship of her class

Citations

Bibliography 
 
 

French Navy ship names